The Herbert Dröse Stadion is an American Football stadium for the Hanau Hornets American football team in Hanau, Germany. It was built in 1951.  Capacity of the venue is 16,000.  It was used as a venue for the 2003 IFAF World Cup.

American football venues in Germany
Main-Kinzig-Kreis
Sports venues in Hesse
1951 establishments in Germany
Sports venues completed in 1951
Football venues in Germany